N II U (pronounced "Into You") is an R&B group from New Jersey consisting of Chuckie Howard, Chris Herbert, Don Carlis and Craig Hill. The group's only pop hit was the single "I Miss You", which peaked at #22 on the Billboard Hot 100 in 1994.

Discography

Albums
 N II U (1994)

Singles

Notes

References

External links

American contemporary R&B musical groups